Holly Marie Wilson (née Miller; born January 3, 1997), known by her stage name Hollyn, is an American Christian music singer and songwriter. Hollyn sings a mixture of pop, R&B, and Christian music. She was a contestant on American Idol during season 12, where she made it to the Hollywood rounds. She released her EP, Hollyn, in 2015, and the album One-Way Conversations in 2017 and Bye, Sad Girl, in 2019, both with Gotee Records. Hollyn often sings with Tobymac.

Early and personal life 
Hollyn was born Holly Marie Miller, on January 3, 1997, in Waverly, Ohio, to Jamie Drew Miller and Tammy Lynn Miller (née, Bales). She has one younger brother named Michael. On Friday November 16, 2018, she got engaged to Dillon Wilson, Young Adults pastor at Oaks Church, Red Oak, Texas. The announcement was made in the 9:15 am service of Oaks Church. The wedding took place on December 31, 2018. The couple welcomed a daughter, Jonas Lovey Wilson, on March 16, 2022.

Music career 

Hollyn started her music recording career in 2013, with her appearance on season 12 of American Idol, where she made it to the Hollywood week rounds before she was eliminated. Hollyn appeared on tobyMac's This Is Not a Test album, where she was featured on "Backseat Driver" and "Lights Shine Bright". She also appeared in Funky Jesus Music by TobyMac. The song has charted on two Billboard magazine Christian Songs chart at No. 29, and Christian Digital Songs at No. 16. Her first extended play, Hollyn, was released on October 16, 2015, from Gotee Records. The song, "Alone", featuring Truett Foster, charted on the Billboard magazine Christian Airplay chart at No. 11 & No. 3 on the Christian Top 40. , This extended play charted at No. 10 on the Billboard magazine Christian Albums chart. She released a single called "Love With Your Life" on July 14, 2016.  On February 10, 2017, Hollyn released her debut album, One-Way Conversations. She released her single "Hola!" on September 15, 2017.

Gotee Records' TobyMac signed Hollyn after viewing her videos on YouTube and contacting her father through a mutual friend. The two collaborated on her song, "Alone", where she was inspired by her favorite verse of the time, Isaiah 30:21, "Whether you look to the left or the right, you will hear a voice saying, 'This is the way. Walk in it.'"

Discography

Studio albums

Extended plays

Singles

As lead artist

As a featured artist

Other charted singles

Awards and nominations 
In 2016, Hollyn was nominated for a Dove Award for 'New Artist of the Year'.

Compilations 
 (2016) WOW Hits 2017 (Deluxe Edition), "Alone (featuring TRU)"  [from Hollyn EP]

Notes

References

1997 births
Living people
American performers of Christian music
Musicians from Ohio
Songwriters from Ohio
American Idol participants
Performers of Christian electronic dance music